South Africa is traditionally the leader in Africa of the automotive industry and now produces more than half a million automobiles annually of all types. While domestic development of trucks and military vehicles exists, cars built under license of foreign brands are the mainstay.

Current situation 

The modern automotive industry in South Africa was launched in 1995 and has since provided a large number of exports. It has motivated global motor vehicle manufacturers to grant production contracts to South African factories. Companies producing in South Africa can take advantage of the low production costs and the access to new markets as a result of trade agreements with the European Union and the Southern African Development Community.

South African factories have built motor vehicles and light truck models since the 1920s, which were during Apartheid era. Manufacturers have historically been concentrated in the provinces of the Eastern Cape, Gauteng and KwaZulu-Natal.

Large component manufacturers with bases in the country are Arvin Exhaust, Bloxwitch, Corning and Senior Flexonics. There are also about 200 automotive component manufacturers in South Africa, and more than 150 others that supply the industry on a non-exclusive basis.

The Department of Trade and Industry's Motor Industry Development Programme (MIDP), which ran from 1995 to 2012, provided a major boost to auto manufacturing in South Africa.

Its successor is the Automotive Production and Development Programme (APDP) which aims to achieve local production of 1.2 million vehicles annually by 2020.

BMW 
BMW caters to 5,000 employees in South Africa and manufactures around 55,000 automobiles a
year. The BMW Rosslyn Plant in Gauteng was founded in 1968 and plays an
important role in the production of equipment used in vehicles.

Ford 
Ford has an assembly plant in Silverton and an engine plant in Gqeberha. In December 2021 it announced a R600 million rand investment for building engines to be used by the new Ford Ranger, in addition to a previously announced R15.8 billion investment for the Silverton assembly plant in Tshwane.

Mercedes
From 1954, Car Distributors Assembly Ltd. started to assemble CKD Mercedes vehicles on a contractor basis. Daimler-Benz AG acquired 50.1 percent of United Cars and Diesel Distributors in 1984 which became Mercedes-Benz of South Africa. It produced 55,900 vehicles in 2010, and in the same year the local market
saw Mercedes-Benz sell 25,400 cars and 6,100 trucks.

MAN 
MAN has been present in Africa since 1968. It does quite well in South Africa, maintaining two plants and a "spares" depot, employing 393 citizens who produce around 2,500 vehicles annually, which sell almost entirely on
the Southern Africa markets.

Nissan 
Nissan also has a plant in Rosslyn, manufacturing mostly bakkies.

Volkswagen 
Volkswagen has had a factory in the Eastern Cape since the early 1950s. It now employs around 6,000 people and produces 120,000 vehicles per year, of which 40,000 are exported to other African countries. The Volkswagen group holds a market share of approximately 22.1% in South Africa.

Other 
Other manufacturers with a substantial presence include:

 Honda
 Mahindra and Mahindra  South Africa 
 Chrysler(No longer operating In South Africa)
 General Motors (no longer operating in South Africa)
 Fiat(Now called Stellantis South Africa)
 Toyota South Africa Motors.                   
                                     
 * Volvo South Africa(Volvo Trucks Only)

History

Early days
Automotives first came to South Africa in 1896 when a Benz Velo was imported and it was demonstrated on January 4 of 1897 in Pretoria in front of President Paul Kruger.

The early days of the South African motoring industry were focused on the American brands Ford and Chevrolet. In 1922 Henry Ford visited Port Elizabeth and by 1923 Ford had started the first assembly plant in PE. General Motors joined soon afterwards producing Ceves Buicks Oldsmobiles and Pontiac's. In the mid-1960s Ford and GM still controlled over 60% of the local car marked with Ford's and Chevrolets dominating until the mid-1950s when the German and British small cars began to impact. In the early 1960s Studebaker became VW set up by managers from Ford PE who went on to develop VW- USA for the German company. By the late 1960s Toyota, Datsun and Mercedes were all developing factories in SA, and British makers were being pushed out. In the late seventies, Sigma Motors had planned to merge with British Leyland, known as Leykor locally - when this merger failed, Leyland had to scramble to create an all-new dealer network in only a month. Leyland's South African presence never recovered.

The apartheid government asked Ford and GM to advise on policy to develop the local automobile component manufacturing industry. Ford and GM engineers asked to include black people in development to address chronic poverty. This was refused. However between Ford, GM and VW the three largest manufacturers (Ford about 28%, GM about 32% and VW about 15%) they accelerated local component development so rapidly that by 1968 that had destroyed Job Reservation policy in the auto industry allowing black people to work in factories previously reserved for whites. After the fuel crisis, the large American cars which had been very popular dropped in sales drastically. By the end of the 1970s, the Mazda 323 and the Volkswagen Golf were the biggest sellers and American-designed cars were no longer regularly available. For a while, the demand for big saloons had been met by assembling the somewhat more compact Australian Fords and Holdens, but these were discontinued in favour of more compact European designs. 1976 showed the worst sales numbers since 1972. Chrysler SA went belly up soon thereafter, merging with Illings (Mazda) to form Sigma. Chrysler had been very successful in the late sixties, with the Valiant range being the most sold passenger car in 1966, 1967, and 1968, but began a serious slide after that. The acquisition of Mitsubishi gave Chrysler a stay of execution but the severe economic climate of the latter half of the 1970s proved too much.

Growth 
The automotive industry catered to 303,000 employees in South Africa in 2003, and in 2004 the country exported fully assembled motor vehicles to 53 countries including many developed countries such as Japan, the United States, the United Kingdom, Australia and Germany, with many of the manufacturers based in South Africa now making it their main production base. In 2004, South Africa was responsible for the manufacture of 84% of all vehicles produced in Africa, 7 million of which are on the South African roads. Also in 2004, the industry made a 6.7% contribution to the GDP of South Africa and 29% of all South African manufacturers made up the country's automotive industry. 2004 also saw 110,000 vehicles exported from South Africa of which 100,000 were passenger vehicles.

In 2007 and next years the automotive industry grew again, producing over 500,000 vehicles annually reaching peak of 616,000 in 2015. While amounting to a small fraction and 22nd place of the global vehicle production of near 100 million, this made great contributions locally, being supremely first in Africa and making up 7.5% of the country's GDP and about 10% of South Africa's manufacturing exports. In 2010 the National Association of Automobile Manufacturers of South Africa (NAAMSA) reported that new vehicle sales exceeded their initial expectations of 7%, with large local growth allowing it to reach 24%, providing a big boost after the 2008/09 recession. This was evident in 2010 with 271,000 vehicles being exported, more than double what was seen in previous years.

Government programs 
Regulations for local content requirements first appeared in the 1960s and were quite strict, and led to a limited number of cars being available to South African motorists. Beginning in the late 1960s, engines had to be built locally for the car to be considered a local product. Phase III of the requirements, for instance, was planned for introduction in the 1970s and required local content to reach 70 percent of a vehicle's total weight. Manufacturers also received tax rebates for additional local content. Early in the program, models were often sold as "declared manufactured", but the government gradually began enforcing the standards and imposing penalties.

The South African government has provided substantial support for the automotive industry in the past 20 years and is still identifying it as a key growth sector. In a Department of Trade and Industry (dti) Budget Vote Address delivered in July 2014, Trade Minister Rob Davies said that “given that automotive and component manufacturing comprises 30% of our industrial sector, with strong linkages to other manufacturing sub-sectors, the impact of such investment on our domestic economy is significant.”

The Department of Trade and Industry has provided a series of programs in order to assist the sector. The first of the programs—the Motor Industry Development Programme (MIDP)—was introduced in 1995. The program had the following key objectives:
 Improvement of the South African automotive industry's international competitiveness 
 Improvement of vehicle affordability in the domestic market
 Encouragement of growth in vehicle and component manufacturing, mainly through exports
 Stabilizing the employment levels in the industry 
 Creating a better foreign exchange balance in the industry
The program is considered a great success. Under the MIDP, the sector has been exhibiting significant growth – it almost doubled in size since 1994.

Its successor is the Automotive Production and Development Programme (APDP), which was implemented on January 1, 2013. The APDP's main goal is to simultaneously stimulate the expansion of local production to 1.2 million vehicles a year by 2020 and increase significantly the local content. The intention is to achieve this through investments, unlike the MIDP which relied mainly on exports. According to the National Association of Automotive Component and Allied Manufacturers (NAACAM), the program has four pillars:
 Import Duty
 Vehicle Assembly Allowance (VAA) BP
 Production Incentive (PI)
 Automotive Investment Scheme (AIS)
The fourth pillar is not a new initiative but a revised incentive. The Automotive Investment Scheme (AIS) was first introduced in 2010/2011, and, since then, incentives in the public sector have amounted to R6.3 billion and supported investments worth R23 billion by original equipment manufacturers in the automotive sector.

Electric vehicles 
As of 2021, South Africa has a tiny electric vehicle market, and none are produced in the country. Electric vehicles are heavily taxed, making them expensive, and the country's large distances and unreliable power supply lead to range and reliability concerns. Only 92 battery electric vehicles were sold in 2020. In October 2021, Cyril Ramaphosa announced that it was prioritising a shift to EV manufacturing.

Quality and productivity

Quality 
Since around 7% of South Africa's economic output is attributed to the automotive industry, it is understandable that the government and companies within South Africa have been trying to encourage greater quality and greater productivity.

The government has been using stricter controls as a way to improve quality. This seems to be working as large improvements in quality have been achieved, and the industry as a whole is more investable to foreign countries. The goal is to achieve production quality equal to that of manufacturers with the highest standards in the automotive industry. With the quality of cars reaching comparable levels to those manufactured in western Europe, exports are increasing. Production has been down, but quality has gone up and is yielding more profit.

Productivity 
While labour productivity in the sector increased by 37% from 1993 to 2001, companies still have concerns about the productivity levels they can achieve in the country. Recent low productivity levels have been attributed to management. Both inadequate management and low trust in management have contributed to a lull and decline in productivity. With labour productivity and transportation being said to be the two biggest problems in the industry, it has become an important issue in need of addressing.

South Africa has multiple options for nurturing its automotive industry and improving productivity through regulation or through investment in automation or through other creative ideas.

Civil cars

Sports cars

AITF Logos

References

External links 
 http://www.bmw.co.za/en/index.html 
 http://www.gov.za/
 http://www.chrysler.co.za/ 
 https://web.archive.org/web/20151222110423/https://www.gmsa.co.za/